Shaun Nicholas Harrad (born 11 December 1984) is an English footballer who plays as a forward.

Playing career

Notts County
Harrad began his career at Notts County, making 29 appearances and scoring one goal. He spent loan spells out at Gresley Rovers and Tamworth, before being released in 2005.

He joined Burton Albion in 2005, gaining promotion with the club in 2009 to the Football League, scoring 16 goals in the promotion season. He was the club's top scorer with 21 League goals in the 2009–10 season, and scored his first career hat-trick against Rotherham United on 11 September 2010.

Northampton Town
On 20 January 2011, Northampton Town signed Harrad for £35,000 on a two and a half-year contract.

Bury
On 31 August 2011, Bury signed Harrad for an undisclosed fee, on a three-year contract. He was given the squad number 25.

Harrad joined Rotherham United on loan in February 2012, on an emergency loan deal, and scored three times for the Millers in his spell there. On 3 August 2012, Harrad was loaned to League Two club Cheltenham Town for the full 2012–13 season.

On 16 January 2014, Harrad had his contract cancelled at Bury.

Alfreton Town and return to Notts County
He signed for Alfreton Town on a contract until the end of the season that same day.

On 21 August 2014, Harrad signed a contract with Notts County, until January 2015. In November 2014, his contract was extended until the end of the season. Harrad was loaned to Cheltenham Town on 26 February 2015 until the end of the season. At the end of the 2014–15 season, Harrad was released by Notts.

Later career
After a spell at Worcester City, Harrad joined Torquay United in January 2016 on a contract until the end of the season.

On 26 July 2016, Harrad signed a 6-month contract with Wrexham. He made his debut for the club on the opening day of the 2016–17 season, in a 0–0 draw with Dover Athletic. In January 2017, Wrexham manager Dean Keates decided against extending Harrad's contract at the club and he was subsequently released. He re-joined Torquay United on a deal until the end of the season later that month.

On 15 July 2017 Harrad signed for Northern Premier League Premier Division side Matlock Town on a one-year deal. On 27 April 2018, Dave Hoole was appointed as the new manager for Matlock Town, where Harrad was going to function as a playing assistant manager. Hoole resigned on 11 September 2018, and Harrad left the position as an assistant manager, but continued at the club just as a player. On 5 December 2018, Harrad was loaned out to Grantham Town for a month. As he came back from the loan, he was released by Matlock.

Two days later, on 9 January 2019, Harrad joined Basford United.

Harrad joined Southern League Premier Division Central side Barwell on 16 July 2019 following a successful trial period with the club. On 15 August 2019, Harrad joined Ilkeston Town as a player and assistant manager. He left the club three months later by mutual agreement.

Career statistics

Honours
Burton Albion
 2008–09 Conference National title

References

External links
 
 Shaun Harrad career stats at ntfc.co.uk.

1984 births
Living people
English footballers
Notts County F.C. players
Gresley F.C. players
Tamworth F.C. players
Burton Albion F.C. players
Northampton Town F.C. players
Bury F.C. players
Rotherham United F.C. players
Cheltenham Town F.C. players
Alfreton Town F.C. players
Worcester City F.C. players
Torquay United F.C. players
Wrexham A.F.C. players
Matlock Town F.C. players
Grantham Town F.C. players
Basford United F.C. players
Barwell F.C. players
Ilkeston Town F.C. players
Association football forwards
England semi-pro international footballers
Footballers from Nottingham
English Football League players
National League (English football) players